Saleng is a town in Kulai District, Johor, Malaysia.

History
Saleng developed from a small new village named (Kampung Baru) into a small town with many new development projects and a township plan.

Demography 

Saleng has a primary school(S.J.K(C)Saleng), a shopping mall, TJ Mart, TJ food court, a famous masjid jamek, and a 24-hours fastfood restaurant.  A zoo is located in Saleng, on the main road. The zoo has already been closed by the authorities.
Federal Route 1.
Foon Yew High School Kulai Campus and Johor Multimedia Super Corridor (MSC) are also near the town.

Administration 
Saleng is administered by Pejabat Daerah Kulaijaya and Kulai Municipal Council.

Population 
Primary ethnic groups:  Malay, Chinese, Indian. Most of the residents are Chinese, the Chinese community speaks mainly the Hakka dialect.

Transportation

Road
The town is accessible by bus from Johor Bahru Sentral railway station (7B, 777, 777B, A1, BET1, JPO1, S&S 7) or Larkin Sentral (2, 13, 777, 888, JPO1) in Johor Bahru. It is also accessible by Muafakat Bus route P-401.

References

Kulai District